Göte Strandsjö (1916–2001) was a Swedish hymnwriter.

1916 births
2001 deaths
Swedish Christian hymnwriters